Belgrave and Birstall railway station was a railway station opened by the Great Central Railway in 1899. It served the villages of Belgrave and Birstall in Leicestershire. It closed in 1963.

In 1991 Leicester North railway station was opened immediately to the south of Belgrave and Birstall railway station by the preserved Great Central heritage railway. It is representative of the 1960s when the line was under the control of British Railways Midland Region. It is the southern terminus of the railway.

Route description 
Curving south of milepost 99, the line continues to climb at the ruling 1 in 176 gradient (10 yards per mile). After passing over an original farm occupation crossing (structure 359), it passes under the new Leicester bypass road (see History) before straightening and levelling out as far as milepost 100 (shortly after overbridge 360). Turning sharply to the west, the railway falls as it approaches the outskirts of Leicester. Shortly after passing under the redundant bridge 361 (blocked off on one side), an ancient right-of-way crosses the trackbed on the level, though only for pedestrian traffic. The final descent into Leicester North station first cuts deeply beneath Park Road (bridge 362) before the formation widens to accommodate the former running lines to pass between each of the Belgrave and Birstall station bridge arches.

Leicester North station consists of a long main platform along the western side of the line and short bay platform on the east. These are joined by a concourse, and between them a simple run-round loop with short spur-siding arrangement allows a slight flexibility in train operation, although services are usually operated under 'One engine in steam' principles. A single short building provides basic services, including a booking office and refreshment servery, a waiting room, and toilet facilities (see History).

Still clearly visible at the station is the walled recess in which sat the signalbox and lamp room, as well as the bricked-up entrance archway of the old Belgrave and Birstall station.

The current bufferstops fall at approximately the 100.75 milepost. Immediately south of here, the formation has been removed to allow the construction of the Leicester Western Distributor road, although a footbridge running close to the alignment of the former trackbed carries pedestrians to Thurcaston road, over which the line used to pass. The bridge here was removed in September 1979 although the southern abutment remains.

Current services 
Heritage steam and diesel train services operate to Leicester North from  every weekend and bank holiday of the year.
Additional services operate on selected weekdays throughout the year.
During the summer time there is a connection to an open-topped tour bus that runs from the station to Leicester City Centre and the National Space Centre, amongst other tourist destinations in and around Leicester.

History

Belgrave and Birstall station 
Belgrave and Birstall station was built as a part of the Great Central Railway's London Extension and opened to passengers on 15 March 1899. The station was built to the standard London Extension country station pattern of a single large 'island' platform between the two running lines, on which stood the station buildings, including ticket office and waiting rooms. Access was made by descending a flight of stairs from a road bridge (structure number 363) that crossed the line.

A signal box and a lamp hut were provided to the south east of the station and further afield a station master's house was constructed. Built within the tight constraints of a cutting, Belgrave and Birstall was the only rural station on the London Extension to have no goods facilities.

After closure 
Belgrave and Birstall station closed on 1 March 1963 along with most other local stations on the London Extension. A group of local enthusiasts formed the Belgrave and Birstall Action Group (B-BAG) in the late 1960s with the aim of restoring the station. When the Main Line Preservation Group (MLPG) formed in 1968 with the aim of preserving a section of the London Extension for the use of steam trains, the B-BAG effectively merged to become a small sub-group of the MLPG.

Vandalism was an ever-present problem for the B-BAG. By summer 1971 police had been summoned on a number of occasions to the station, which was reported to be in a "very sad state". As late as spring 1972 the action group was not yet allowed access to the site to repair vandalism, and buildings were in a dangerous condition which would require "substantial rebuilding".

Restoration work at the station began in June 1972, and considerable efforts were made in making some of the buildings safe. Other buildings required more substantive work.

In 1976 the remaining track was lifted, leaving no rail access to Belgrave and Birstall station.

Ever present vandalism continued to leave the station buildings in a dangerous state, and the B-BAG reluctantly decided to demolish three of the station buildings – the Gentleman's toilets; Station Master's Office; and Ladies' Room and General Waiting Room buildings were removed on 18 and 19 June 1977. The Booking Office; Stairs; and "tunnel rooms" were bricked up for later use. The remaining structures were removed in 1985, leaving only the platform and bricked up road-level entrance. The entrance archway remains to this day, though bricked up, as can be seen on recent photographs.

A full and detailed history of Belgrave and Birstall station including an account of how it came to be built; highlights from its operational years and an examination of the failed attempt to save it (with a description of some of the internal political and financial issues faced by the would-be preservationsists) leading to its eventual reinstatement as Leicester North (for Belgrave and Birstall - since 2021), are given in the book: "Belgrave and Birstall Remembered" by John Powdrill (2020), published by The 4 Buffers ISBN 978-1-5272-6760-2.

The Birstall Extension 
Following the restoration of heritage train services between Loughborough Central railway station and Rothley railway station by the MLST, a new operating company had been formed – Great Central Railway (1976) Ltd. (GCR76). This company had subsequently obtained a Light Railway Order (LRO) to allow the heritage line to operate its own trains without British Rail supervision. The powers granted by GCR76's LRO had encompassed the MLPG goal of preserving the line as far as Birstall, and as such GCR76 had the legal power to lay new track from its Rothley rail-head to the platform at Birstall. By summer 1984 it was felt that the railway's finances were now viable enough to allow what was to become known as the Birstall Extension. A favourable preliminary survey of structures between Rothley and Birstall gave the board of directors confidence enough to announce officially in Autumn 1984 that the railway would be extending to Belgrave and Birstall.

Work on the extension had started to clear vegetation that had grown on the track bed. More serious problems to be handled were the encroachment of road improvements. To the immediate south of the station, a new road from Mowmacre Hill to Redhill roundabout would cut through the railway's embankment. Leicester City Council agreed to build an access road (eventually named The Sidings) to the railway from this new road, later to be known as the Leicester Western Distributor road. A mile to the north of the station, the new Leicester by-pass was planned to be built crossing the line. This effectively set a deadline of 1986 to build the first mile of track, since the new bridge was to add greatly to the cost of the by-pass. It was suggested to the railway that if there was no railway line to cross by 1986, it would be cheaper to have the LRO to Birstall rescinded on the grounds that the company had no plans to go there.

By Spring 1985, discussion on the design of the new station to replace Belgrave and Birstall had begun. The appeal to fund the Birstall Extension was officially launched on 8 June 1985 by H.R.H. The Duke of Gloucester, who inserted a ceremonial chromium-plated bolt into the trackwork at Rothley. With Manpower Services Commission assisted work continuing on the extension, design ideas for the new station at Birstall all incorporated the original platform and bridge as part of the scheme, although schemes where the platform would be extended to the north of the road bridge were formally scrapped. By late 1987, however, it seemed that through co-funding via Leicester City, who planned to build a museum 'Industrial village' adjacent to the site, a wholly new station to the south of Belgrave and Birstall would be built, requiring the removal of the existing platform.

Leicester North station 

The Birstall Extension finally arrived at the bare platform of Belgrave and Birstall station during spring 1988. Only sufficient track was laid against the existing platform to enable its demolition. Delays in completing the road from the new Leicester Western Distributor Road caused further delays by preventing the delivery of ballast for packing. Feasibility studies for the industrial museum were put on hold, which in turn required the retainment of the island platform for longer than planned. In early 1989, plans were submitted for extending track from the limit of the existing LRO into the land under jurisdiction of Leicester City Council. The eventual outcome was that Charnwood Borough Council (the GCR's landlord up to Birstall) and Leicester City Council came to an arrangement for a slight extension of the railway into Leicester, and a new LRO was submitted before Parliament for a new Leicester North Station.

Throughout 1989, ballast was brought in and deposited on the Belgrave and Birstall platform for loading into rail ballast wagons, which then ferried the material along the extension to enable the new track to be correctly packed and aligned so that it would be fit for passenger traffic. All this allowed the Birstall Extension to be officially opened on Thursday 15 November 1990. GCR locomotive No.506 "Butler Henderson" hauled a train of MLST directors and local civic dignitaries from Loughborough Central to Rothley, where they changed to a specially fitted push-pull train for the return ride to Belgrave and Birstall. Regular passenger services, push-pull operated, soon resumed to a point just short of the old platform.

Work commenced on removing the old platform and building the new Leicester North station to the south. On 5 July 1991 the new station was opening by the Rt.Hon. Michael Heseltine MP, flanked by the replica of Stephenson's Rocket and No.35005 Canadian Pacific, each running into its own platform at Leicester North. The inclusion of a run-round loop at Leicester North removed the need for push-pull operation between Birstall and Rothley and through services from Loughborough Central could begin. The buffers set into the end of the platform were donated by British Rail and originate from London's Marylebone station, the terminus of the Great Central Railway's London Extension. Due to the lack of station buildings, a carriage was regularly used to act as a ticket office and kiosk.

Full planning permission was granted on 7 October 1992, for the construction of the main building, concourse and overall roof at Leicester North station., however after it was discovered that a high-pressure water main ran through the site the plans were dropped.

Development of the station since opening has been slow due to the return of vandalism. The problems of travellers camping on the small car park at the top of "The Sidings" access road was remedied in 1998 by the installation of a lockable gate.

In late 1998, planning permission was granted for a modest construction on the down platform, intended as waiting room, booking office and toilet. Permission was also granted for a canopy, however it was not intended to erect this at the same time as the building, the whole approach for Leicester North development having switched to a modular approach. Following a £30,000 bequest to the MLST by the Edith Murphy Trust, only £20,000 remained to be raised at the time the drawings of the new building were first published The ceremonial "Cutting of the first sod" by the Countess of Lanesborough took place on 9 March 1999 as part of the railway's centenary celebrations, with contractors beginning work on the foundations on 19 April and was completed by late June.

 Construction progress was hindered by repeat vandalism, with the toppling of freshly laid brickwork on several occasions. Brickwork was complete to roof level by late January 2000, with a variety of fitting-out, including connection to services and the installation of roller-shutter doors, plastering, and decoration, taking place throughout mid-2000. Shortly after, however, the contractor was unable to continue work, and further progress would not take place until July 2001 after a new contractor was assigned to complete the building and tarmac the platform. The building opened for public use soon after.

No substantial further development of the station has taken place since the opening of the waiting rooms, although a variety of small additions including picnic tables have been added to the station in recent years. A small canopy (pictured above) was built around the station building. An ambitious set of features was originally planned, including a second engine shed, a turntable, garden and another platform.

Over the weekend of 2 and 3 September 2006, Leicester North hosted the commemorative speeches marking the 40th anniversary of the closure of the Great Central as a through route from Sheffield to London.

Railway museum
On 8 December 2012 it was announced that an annexe to the National Railway Museum would be built close to Leicester North, although funding for this fell through in December 2017 and alternative funding is being sought.

References 

(Main Line is the quarterly news magazine of the preserved Great Central Railway.)

External links 
 Photo map of Belgrave and Birstall section of railway

 

Disused railway stations in Leicestershire
Former Great Central Railway stations
Heritage railway stations in Leicestershire
Great Central Railway (preserved)
Railway stations in Great Britain opened in 1899
Railway stations in Great Britain closed in 1963
1899 establishments in England